"Sometimes I Forget" is a pop song recorded by Swedish singer Agnes taken from her third album Dance Love Pop. The track was written by Anders Hansson, Steve Diamond and Agnes. It was released as the album's third single in France, and the fourth single in Italy and Belgium.

Background and release
The track was first heard on Agnes' third album Dance Love Pop, released in 2008 in Sweden. When "I Need You Now" was chosen as the third single across Europe, Agnes French label Sony Music decided a different path for her and released "Sometimes I Forget" as the follow-up to her previous singles "Release Me" and "On and On". Like the previous singles, a French version was recorded in January 2010 for the single release, and together with a couple of new remixes a Promo CD was released to radio and television in mid-February.

To date, Agnes has sold over 160,000 singles in France.

"Sometimes I Forget" was featured on the compilation album "M6 Hits 2010" which was released as digital download on March 15, 2010 the very same day that the music video premiered. Though it has yet not been released as a proper single.

Music video

The music video for "Sometimes I Forget" was filmed in Gothenburg, Sweden on March 3, 2010 and is part English, part French. Just like Agnes' earlier videos for "On and On", the international and the UK edit, it was directed by Torbjörn Martin and the production agency is STARK production.

The video starts off with Agnes sitting in front of a make-up table in her dressing room, wearing a 1940s peach silk robe and Swarowski crystals. This scene shifts with intermediate sequences of Agnes in the backseat of a car, on her way to her concert and of her lying in bed singing. The video then shows her in a silver haute couture dress backstage, walking through the corridors to the stage. She then enters the stage, where she is met by flashlights and an audience applauding frenetically. She steps up to an old 1940s microphone and starts to sing the chorus. In the end, the light turns off and the hall seems empty and Agnes walks out to the sound of her shoes echoing through the room. The video premiered on March 15, 2010, on M6's official YouTube channel.

An English edition was posted on Agnes' official website on June 2, 2010, made for the single release outside France.

Release history

Track listing
Digital Download (Italian release)
(Released: May 7, 2010) (Label:Planet)
"Sometimes I Forget"  [Radio Edit]  — 3:36
"Sometimes I Forget"  [The Gorque Remix]  — 3:53
"Sometimes I Forget"  [Album Version]  — 4:13

Digital Download (Belgium release)
(Released: November 16, 2010) (Label:BIP)
"Sometimes I Forget"  [Radio Edit]  — 3:44
"Sometimes I Forget"  [French Radio Edit]  — 3:45
"Sometimes I Forget"  [Club Mix]  — 3:20
"Sometimes I Forget"  [The Gorque Remix]  — 3:51

Charts and Sales

Charts

Official remixes
Album version - 4:13
Radio Edit 3:36
French Radio Edit 3:36
2FrenchGuys Mix - 3:20
The Gorque Remix - 3:53

References

2010 singles
Agnes (singer) songs
Pop ballads
2008 songs
Songs written by Agnes (singer)
Songs written by Anders Hansson (songwriter)
Songs written by Steve Diamond (songwriter)